Amor, vida de mi vida (Love, life of my life) is an aria for baritone from the zarzuela  Maravilla composed by Federico Moreno Torroba to a libretto by Antonio Quintero and Jesús María de Arozamena. It premiered in Madrid in 1941, where the aria was sung by the baritone, Luis Sagi-Vela. It is a standard in Spanish concert lyrics, and was included in the repertoire of The Three Tenors (sung by Plácido Domingo).

The aria expresses the heartache of Rafael, a talented but unlucky singer, in love with Elvira. However, Elvira is in a relationship with Faustino, who is the theatrical producer of her mother, Maravilla, an opera diva who will be Rafael's partner in her next performance.

References

External links
Aria text and English translation on zarzuela.net

Opera excerpts
1941 compositions
Zarzuela